Thomas E. Kluczynski (September 29, 1903 – May 16, 1994) was an American jurist.

Born in Chicago, Illinois, Kluczynski received his LL.B. degree from the University of Chicago Law School in 1927. He then practiced law until 1945, when he was appointed a commissioner of the Illinois Industrial Commission. In 1950, Governor Adlai Stevenson appointed Klucyznski to circuit court. In 1962, Kluczynski was appointed to the Illinois Appellate Court. From 1966 to 1976 and from 1978 to 1980, Kluczynski served on the Supreme Court of Illinois. Kluczynski died in Chicago, Illinois.

References

1903 births
1994 deaths
Lawyers from Chicago
Politicians from Chicago
University of Chicago Law School alumni
Illinois state court judges
Judges of the Illinois Appellate Court
Justices of the Illinois Supreme Court
20th-century American judges
20th-century American lawyers